Jana Moravcová, married Jana Neumannová (8 May 1937 in Černčice – 12 June 2018) was a Czech poet, writer, and translator. She had a degree from Charles University and taught in Cuba. Some of her work appeared in science fiction anthologies.

References

Charles University alumni
Czech-language writers
Czech science fiction writers
Czech translators
Czech women poets
People from Louny
Translators to Czech
Translators from Russian
Translators from Spanish
1937 births
2018 deaths
People from Louny District